Dickson Agyeman (born 14 September 1985) is a Belgian retired football midfielder.

Career 
Agemang played for K. Berchem Sport from 1995 until 1999 and from 1999 to 2007 by K.F.C. Germinal Beerschot. In 2007, FC Eindhoven signed him on a two-year contract from K.F.C. Germinal Beerschotduring the summer and turned back to Belgium in Summer 2009 to sign with R.A.E.C. Mons. In February 2011 he signed a two-year contract with FF Jaro.

Attributes 
His game style resembles that of Edgar Davids.

Statistics

Honours

Club
Beerschot A.C.
 Belgian Cup: 2004–05

References

1985 births
Living people
Belgian footballers
Footballers from Antwerp
Belgian Pro League players
Challenger Pro League players
Eerste Divisie players
Veikkausliiga players
Beerschot A.C. players
FC Eindhoven players
K. Berchem Sport players
FF Jaro players
Turun Palloseura footballers
Belgian expatriate sportspeople in the Netherlands
Belgian expatriate footballers
Expatriate footballers in the Netherlands
Expatriate footballers in Finland
Association football midfielders